The Chicago Bears are a professional American football team based in Chicago. The Bears compete in the National Football League (NFL) as a member club of the league's National Football Conference (NFC) North Division. The Bears have won nine NFL Championships, including one Super Bowl, and hold the NFL record for the most enshrinees in the Pro Football Hall of Fame and the most retired jersey numbers. The Bears have also recorded the second-most victories of any  NFL franchise, only behind the Green Bay Packers.

The franchise was founded in Decatur, Illinois, on September 20, 1920 and became professional on September 17, 1920, and moved to Chicago in 1921. It is one of only two remaining franchises from the NFL's founding in 1920, along with the Arizona Cardinals, which was originally also in Chicago. The team played home games at Wrigley Field on Chicago's North Side through the 1970 season; they now play at Soldier Field on the Near South Side, adjacent to Lake Michigan. The Bears have a long-standing rivalry with the Green Bay Packers.

The team headquarters, Halas Hall, is in the Chicago suburb of Lake Forest, Illinois. The Bears practice at adjoining facilities there during the season, and began hosting Training Camp at Halas Hall in 2020 after major renovations.

Franchise history

1919–1939: Early Bears

Originally named the Decatur Staleys, the club was established by the A. E. Staley food starch company of Decatur, Illinois as a company team. This was the typical start for several early professional football franchises. The team played independently in 1919, winning the Central Illinois Championship. The company hired George Halas and Edward "Dutch" Sternaman in 1920 to run the team. The 1920 Decatur Staleys season was their inaugural regular season completed in the newly formed American Professional Football Association (later renamed the National Football League (NFL) in 1922).

Full control of the team was turned over to Halas and Sternaman in 1921. Official team and league records cite Halas as the founder as he took over the team in 1920 when it became a charter member of the NFL.

The team relocated to Chicago in 1921, where the club was renamed the Chicago Staleys. Under an agreement reached by Halas and Sternaman with Staley, Halas purchased the rights to the club from Staley for US$100.

In 1922, Halas changed the team name from the Staleys to the Bears. The team moved into Wrigley Field, which was home to the Chicago Cubs baseball franchise. As with several early NFL franchises, the Bears derived their nickname from their city's baseball team (some directly, some indirectly – like the Bears, whose young are called "cubs"). Halas liked the bright orange-and-blue colors of his alma mater, the University of Illinois, and the Bears adopted those colors as their own, albeit in a darker shade of each (the blue is Pantone 5395, navy blue, and the orange is Pantone 1665, similar to burnt orange).

The Staleys/Bears dominated the league in the early years. Their rivalry with the Chicago Cardinals, the oldest in the NFL (and a crosstown rival from 1920 to 1959), was key in four out of the first six league titles. During the league's first six years, the Bears lost twice to the Canton Bulldogs (who took two league titles over that span), and split with their crosstown rival Cardinals (going 4–4–2 against each other over that span), but no other team in the league defeated the Bears more than a single time. During that span, the Bears posted 34 shutouts.

The Bears' rivalry with the Green Bay Packers is one of the oldest and most storied in American professional sports, dating back to 1921 (the Green Bay Packers were an independent team until they joined the NFL in 1921). In one infamous incident that year, Halas got the Packers expelled from the league in order to prevent their signing a particular player, and then graciously got them re-admitted after the Bears had closed the deal with that player.

In 1924 the Bears claimed the Championship after defeating the Cleveland Bulldogs on December 7, even putting the title "World's Champions" on their 1924 team photo. But the NFL had ruled that games after November 30 did not count towards league standings, and the Bears had to settle for second place behind Cleveland.

During the 1920s the club was responsible for triggering the NFL's long-standing rule that a player could not be signed until his college's senior class had graduated. The NFL took that action as a consequence of the Bears' aggressive signing of famous University of Illinois player Red Grange within a day of his final game as a collegian.

Despite much of the on-field success, the Bears were a team in trouble. They faced the problem of increased operating costs and flatlined attendance. The Bears would only draw roughly 5,000–6,000 fans a game, while a University of Chicago game would draw 40,000–50,000 fans a game. By adding top college football draw Red Grange to the roster, the Bears knew that they found something to draw more fans to their games. C.C. Pyle was able to secure a $2,000 per game contract for Grange, and in one of the first games, the Bears defeated the Green Bay Packers, 21–0. However, Grange remained on the sidelines while learning the team's plays from Bears quarterback Joey Sternaman. Later in 1925, The Bears would go on a barnstorming tour, showing off the best football player of the day. 75,000 people paid to see Grange lead the Bears to a 17–7 victory over the Los Angeles Tigers, who were a quickly put together team of West Coast college all-stars. After a loss to San Francisco, the Bears cruised to a 60–3 over a semi-pro team called the Portland All Stars.

Any hopes that Grange would lead the Bears to glory in 1926 were quickly dashed. A failed contract talk led to Grange bolting to the AFL's New York Yankees, owned by Pyle. The Bears also lost star quarterback Joey Sternaman, who joined the Chicago Bulls of the AFL. The Bears replaced Grange with Paddy Driscoll, a star football player in his own right. The Bears used the money made from the Grange barn-storming tour to sign the man that replaced him. Grange split his time between making movies and playing football. However, the time was not right to have two competing pro football leagues, and the AFL folded after only one season. Grange would return to the Bears.

After the financial losses of the  Championship season, Halas' partner Dutch Sternaman left the organization. Halas maintained full control of the Bears until his death in 1983. He also coached the team off-and-on for forty seasons, an NFL record. In the 1932 "Unofficial" NFL Championship, the Bears defeated the Portsmouth Spartans in the first indoor American football game at Chicago Stadium.

The success of the playoff game led the NFL to institute a championship game. In the first NFL Championship, the Bears played against the New York Giants, defeating them 23–21. The teams met again in the 1934 NFL Championship where the Giants, wearing sneakers defeated the Bears 30–13 on a cold, icy day at the Polo Grounds.

1940s: The Monsters of the Midway

From 1940 to 1947, quarterback Sid Luckman led the Bears to victories in four out of the five NFL Championship Games in which they appeared. The team acquired the University of Chicago's discarded nickname "Monsters of the Midway" and their now-famous helmet wishbone "C", as well as a newly penned theme song that declared them "The Pride and Joy of Illinois". One famous victory during that period was their 73–0 victory over the favored Washington Redskins at Griffith Stadium in the 1940 NFL Championship Game; the score is still an NFL record for lopsided results. The secret behind the one-sided outcome was the introduction of a new offensive formation by Halas. The T-formation, as Halas named it, involved two running backs instead of the traditional one in the backfield. Luckman established himself as one of the franchise's most elite quarterbacks. Between 1939 and 1950, he set the Bears' passing records for most career touchdowns, yards, and completions.

1950s–1968: Late-Halas era

The late 1960s and early-1970s produced notable players like Dick Butkus, Gale Sayers, and Brian Piccolo, who died of embryonal carcinoma in 1970. The American television network ABC aired a movie about Piccolo in 1971 entitled Brian's Song, starring James Caan and Billy Dee Williams in the roles of Piccolo and Sayers respectively; Jack Warden won an Emmy Award for his performance as Halas. The movie was later released for theater screenings after first being shown on television. Despite Hall of Fame careers, Butkus and Sayers would also have their careers cut short due to injuries, hamstringing the Bears of this era.

Halas retired as coach in 1967 and spent the rest of his days in the front office. He became the only person to be involved with the NFL throughout the first 60 years of its existence. He was also a member of the Pro Football Hall of Fame's first induction class in 1963. As the only living founder of the NFL at the February 1970 merger between the NFL and the American Football League, the owners honored Halas by electing him the first President of the National Football Conference, a position that he held until his death in 1983. In his honor, the NFL named the NFC Championship trophy as the George Halas Memorial Trophy.

1969–1982: Struggles

After the merger, the Bears finished the 1970 season last place in their division, a repeat of their placing in the 1969 season. In 1975, the Bears drafted Walter Payton from Jackson State University with their first pick. He won the NFL Most Valuable Player Award in the 1977–78 season. Payton would go on to eclipse Jim Brown's NFL career rushing record in 1984 before retiring in 1987, and would hold the mark until , when Emmitt Smith of the Dallas Cowboys surpassed it. Payton's career and personality would capture the hearts of Bear fans, who called him "Sweetness". He died from a rare form of liver cancer in 1999 at the age of 45.

On November 1, 1983, a day after the death of George Halas, his oldest daughter, Virginia McCaskey, took over as the majority owner of the team. Her husband, Ed McCaskey, succeeded her father as the chairman of the board. Their son Michael became the third president in team history. Mrs. McCaskey holds the honorary title of "secretary of the board of directors", but the 90-year–old matriarch has been called the glue that holds the franchise together. Mrs. McCaskey's reign as the owner of the Bears was not planned, as her father originally earmarked her brother, George "Mugs" Halas Jr. as the heir apparent to the franchise. However, he died of a massive heart attack in 1979. Her impact on the team is well-noted as her own family has dubbed her "The First Lady of Sports", and the Chicago Sun-Times has listed her as one of Chicago's most powerful women.

1983–1985: Contenders, then Super Bowl Champions

Mike Ditka, a tight end for the Bears from 1961 to 1966, was hired to coach the team by George Halas in 1982. His gritty personality earned him the nickname "Iron Mike". The team reached the NFC Championship game in 1984. In the 1985 season the fire in the Bears–Packers rivalry was re-lit when Ditka used 315-pound defensive tackle "Refrigerator" Perry as a running back in a touchdown play at Lambeau Field, against the Packers. The Bears won their ninth NFL Championship, first since the AFL-NFL merger, in Super Bowl XX after the 1985 season in which they dominated the NFL with their then-revolutionary 46 defense and a cast of characters that recorded the novelty rap song "The Super Bowl Shuffle". The season was notable in that the Bears had only one loss, the "unlucky 13th" game of the season, a Monday night affair in which they were defeated by the Miami Dolphins. At the time, much was made of the fact that the  Dolphins were the only franchise in history to have had an undefeated season and post-season. The Dolphins came close to setting up a rematch in the Super Bowl, but lost to the New England Patriots in the AFC title game. "The Super Bowl Shuffle" was videotaped the day after that Monday night loss in Miami.

1986–2003: Post-Super Bowl era
After the 1985 Championship season, the Bears remained competitive throughout the 1980s but failed to return to the Super Bowl under Ditka. Between the firing of Ditka and the hiring of Lovie Smith, the Bears had two head coaches, Dave Wannstedt and Dick Jauron. While both head coaches led the team to the playoffs once (Wannstedt in 1994 and Jauron in 2001), neither was able to accumulate a winning record or bring the Bears back to the Super Bowl. Therefore, the 1990s was largely considered to be a disappointment.

Before the Bears hired Jauron in January 1999, Dave McGinnis (Arizona's defensive coordinator, and a former Bears assistant under Ditka and Wannstedt) backed out of taking the head coaching position. The Bears scheduled a press conference to announce the hiring before McGinnis agreed to contract terms. Soon after Jauron's hiring, Mrs. McCaskey fired her son Michael as president, replacing him with Ted Phillips and promoting Michael to chairman of the board. Phillips, the current Bears president, became the first man outside of the Halas-McCaskey family to run the team.

2004–2012: Lovie Smith era
Lovie Smith, hired on January 15, 2004, is the third post-Ditka head coach. Joining the Bears as a rookie head coach, Smith brought the highly successful Tampa 2 defensive scheme with him to Chicago. Before his second season with the Bears, the team rehired their former offensive coordinator and then Illinois head coach Ron Turner to improve the Bears' struggling offense. In , the Bears won their division and reached the playoffs for the first time in four years. The Bears improved upon their success the following season, by clinching their second consecutive NFC North title during Week 13 of the  season, winning their first playoff game since 1995, and earning a trip to Super Bowl XLI. However, they fell short of the championship, losing 29–17 to the Indianapolis Colts. Following the 2006 season, the club decided to give Smith a contract extension through 2011, at roughly $5 million per year. This comes a season after being the lowest-paid head coach in the National Football League.

Through the 2010 season, they led the NFL in overall franchise wins with 704 and had an overall record of 704–512–42 (going 687–494–42 during the regular season and 17–18 in the playoffs). On November 18, 2010, the Bears recorded franchise win number 700 in a win against the Miami Dolphins.

The Bears made one of the biggest trades in franchise history, acquiring Pro Bowl quarterback Jay Cutler from the Denver Broncos in exchange for Kyle Orton and draft picks on April 2, 2009. After a disappointing 2009 campaign with the team going 7–9, Mike Martz was hired as the team's offensive coordinator on February 1, 2010. On March 5, 2010, the Bears signed defensive end Julius Peppers, running back Chester Taylor, and tight end Brandon Manumaleuna, spending over $100 million on the first day of free agency. Also during the 2010 offseason, Michael McCaskey was replaced by brother George McCaskey as chairman of the Bears. With a 38–34 win against the New York Jets, the Bears clinched the No. 2 seed and a first-round bye for the 2010–11 NFL playoffs. In their first Playoff game since Super Bowl XLI, The Bears defeated the No. 4 seed Seattle Seahawks 35–24 in the Divisional Round. The Bears reached the NFC Championship Game, where they played Green Bay Packers at Soldier Field – only the second playoff meeting between the two storied rivals, the only other game played in 1941. The Bears lost the game, 21–14.

The team started the 2011 season strong with a 7–3 record, and running back Matt Forté led the NFL in total yards from scrimmage. Eventually, quarterback Jay Cutler fractured his thumb, and Forté also was lost for the season against the Kansas City Chiefs after spraining his MCL, and the Bears, with Caleb Hanie playing, lost five straight before winning against the Minnesota Vikings with Josh McCown starting over Hanie. At season's end, general manager Jerry Angelo was fired, and former Chiefs director of scouting and former Bears scout Phil Emery was brought in. Offensive coordinator Mike Martz resigned, and eventually retired, and was replaced by offensive line coach Mike Tice. The Bears made another notable move by trading for Miami Dolphins receiver and Pro Bowl MVP Brandon Marshall. The Bears became the first team in NFL history to return six interceptions for touchdowns in the first seven games of the season, with another pick-six by Brian Urlacher in Week 9 bringing Chicago two behind the record set by the 1961 San Diego Chargers. However, the Bears missed the playoffs with a record of 10–6 (after starting the season 7–1, the first team to start with the record and miss the playoffs since the 1996 Washington Redskins), and Smith was fired on December 31.

2013–2014: Marc Trestman years
Then-CFL head coach and former NFL journeyman Marc Trestman was hired to succeed Smith after an exhaustive search that included at least 13 known candidates. On March 20, 2013, Brian Urlacher's 13-year tenure with the Bears ended when both sides failed to agree on a contract. The Trestman era began on September 8 with a 24–21 win over the Cincinnati Bengals, making Trestman the fourth head coach in Bears history to win in his coaching debut, after George Halas (1920), Neill Armstrong (1978) and Dick Jauron (1999). The Bears ended the 2013 season 8–8, barely missing the playoffs after losing in the final week of the season to the Packers. Despite having a second-ranked offense that set numerous franchise records, the defense greatly worsened as it set franchise worsts in categories like yards allowed (6,313).

The following season was a disaster for the Bears, with the offense regressing to finish outside the top 20 in scoring. The team also allowed 50-point games in two straight weeks against the Patriots and Packers, including a franchise-high 42 points and NFL-record six touchdowns allowed in the first half against the latter, to become the first team since the 1923 Rochester Jeffersons to allow at least 50 points in consecutive games. The Bears ended the year 5–11 and last in the NFC North. Trestman and Emery were fired after the season ended.

2015–2017: John Fox years
The Bears hired Ryan Pace of the New Orleans Saints to be their new general manager on January 8, 2015. On January 16, 2015, John Fox accepted a four-year deal to become head coach. In Fox's first season as head coach, the Bears saw improvements from 2014; after USA Today projected the Bears to win three games, they doubled that total and finished the season with a 6–10 record, including a Thanksgiving win over the Packers at Lambeau Field.

However, during the 2016 season, the Bears regressed heavily, compiling a 3–13 record (their worst since the NFL's change to 16-game seasons in 1978). The season included several injuries to starters and secondary players, including Jay Cutler, who only played five games as a result of two separate injuries. Backup quarterback Brian Hoyer started the next three games before a broken arm put him out for the season. He was replaced by Matt Barkley, who made his first career start with the Bears. None of the three quarterbacks returned for the 2017 season.

In the 2017 NFL Draft, the team selected quarterback Mitchell Trubisky with the second-overall pick, who sat behind newly signed quarterback Mike Glennon for the first four games before taking over. The Bears ended the season 5–11 and again finished last in the NFC North. On January 1, 2018, Fox was fired, ending his tenure in Chicago with a 14–34 record.

2018–2021: Matt Nagy years

The Bears hired Matt Nagy from the Kansas City Chiefs as their new head coach in January 2018. General manager Ryan Pace signed receivers Taylor Gabriel, Allen Robinson, and Trey Burton in the offseason to complement second-year quarterback Mitchell Trubisky. The Bears also acquired linebacker Khalil Mack in a block-blockbuster trade from the Oakland Raiders to further bolster their defense, sending a package of draft picks that includes 2019 and 2020 1st round draft picks in exchange. Nagy's Bears clinched the NFC North on December 16, 2018, for the first time since 2010 with a 24–17 victory over the Green Bay Packers. The Bears finished the 2018 season with a 12–4 record. They lost to the defending Super Bowl Champions Philadelphia Eagles in the Wild Card round of the Playoffs after Cody Parkey's game-winning field goal attempt was partially tipped and hit the uprights in the final seconds of the game, a play coined the "Double Doink". Despite the first-round exit, Nagy was named Coach of the Year by the Pro Football Writers Association and Associated Press. He was the first Bears coach to be given the AP award since Lovie Smith in 2005 and the fifth in team history.

In 2019, the team regressed to an 8–8 record, though Nagy's combined 20 wins in 2018 and 2019 were the most by a Bears head coach in his first two seasons. During the year, renovations to Halas Hall were completed, allowing the team to move Training Camp from Ward Field on the campus of Olivet Nazarene University in Bourbonnais, Illinois to Lake Forest for 2020.

The Bears opened the 2020 season with a 5–1 record. However, they lost their next six games. The Bears won three of their last four games to finish the season with an 8–8 record. Despite their finish, the Bears qualified for the 2020–21 NFL playoffs, which was expanded to include one additional wildcard team from each conference. The New Orleans Saints defeated the Bears in the opening round of the playoffs, 21–9. The team did not re-sign Trubisky after the 2020 season and instead allowed him to become a free agent.

Prior to the 2021 season, the Bears traded up in the 2021 NFL Draft to select quarterback Justin Fields 11th overall. The team also signed veteran quarterback Andy Dalton in free agency. Dalton was initially declared the Bears starting quarterback, but Fields won the position after Dalton was injured. The Bears finished the season with a 6–11 record and missed the playoffs. Nagy and general manager Ryan Pace were fired after the season's conclusion. Nagy posted a 34–33 record over four seasons with two playoff berths, while Pace compiled a 48–65 record over seven seasons.

2022–present: Matt Eberflus years
On January 25, 2022, the Bears hired Ryan Poles as their general manager. The team hired Matt Eberflus as the franchise's 17th head coach two days later. The Bears struggled throughout the 2022 season, which included a franchise-record 10-game losing streak. They finished with an NFL worst 3–14 record, which secured the team the first overall pick in the 2023 NFL Draft.

Ownership

The team is primarily owned by the heirs of George Halas. His daughter, Virginia Halas McCaskey, her children, and grandchildren control 80 percent of the stock, and McCaskey is empowered to speak for the interests of her children and grandchildren as well as her own. Pat Ryan, former chairman and CEO of Aon Corp., and former Aon director Andrew J. McKenna's estate own 19.7% of the club. In a Crain's Chicago Business article, one businessman described his wishes for the team to maximize its potential. In 2009, Yahoo! Sports listed the McCaskeys as the third worst owner in the NFL, stating "[T]hey get less for what they've got than any team in our league."

In 2020, Forbes magazine reported that the franchise is worth $3.525 billion, making it the seventh richest franchise in the NFL. Chicago is the third largest media market in the United States.

Sponsorships
The team has major sponsorship deals with Dr Pepper Snapple Group, Miller Brewing Company, PNC Financial Services, United Airlines, Verizon, Xfinity, and Proven IT. The team was the first in the NFL to have a presenting sponsor, with the 2004 season advertised as "Bears Football presented by BankOne (now Chase)". Additionally, the Bears have an agreement with WFLD (the Fox owned-and-operated station in Chicago) to broadcast pre-season football games.

Logos and uniforms

Team culture

Mascots and cheerleaders

Before the 2003 season, the team had two unofficial mascots named "Rocky" and "Bearman". "Rocky" was a man who donned a #1 Bears jersey, carried a megaphone, and started chants all over Soldier Field during the 1970s, 1980s, and early 1990s, in a fashion similar to Fireman Ed. There is no known source of who "Rocky" was, and presumably currently lives in Northwestern Indiana. Don Wachter, also known as "Bearman", is a season ticket holder who decided in 1995 that he could also assist the team by cheerleading, similar to Rocky. The club allowed him to run across the field with a large Bears flag during player introductions and each team score (a role currently done by the Bears 4th Phase and Bears captains). In 1996, he donned his "costume" of face paint, bear head and arms, and a number 46 jersey. "Bearman" was forced to stop wearing his costume with the introduction of Staley Da Bear in 2003; however, in 2005, Wachter was allowed in costume again.

Staley Da Bear is an anthropomorphic bear with a customized No. 00 jersey, with blue and orange eyes, synonymous with the team's main colors. His name is eponymous to corn processing company A. E. Staley, who founded the Bears' franchise. Like Rocky and Bearman, he entertains Bears fans, but like other NFL mascots, and mascots in general, Staley also makes various visits to charity events, parties, Chicago Rush AFL games, and other Bears-related events, as well as taking part in various games with his "furballs" against youth football teams at halftime.

The team also formerly had their own cheerleading squad called the Chicago Honey Bears, who were formed in 1976. However, Bears owner Virginia Halas McCaskey terminated them after the 1985 season. The squad's uniforms have changed 3 times: from 1976 to 1979, the uniform was a white bodysuit with navy blue sleeves, then from 1980 to 1984 it became a white bodysuit, but with orange sleeves and the navy was moved to the trim, and in the squad's final season in 1985, the uniform was redesigned with an orange sequin vest.

Philanthropy
Since 1998, the Bears have partnered with 'A Safe Place,' a domestic violence shelter in Waukegan, Illinois. In June 2017, current and former Bears employees helped with renovations at the shelter by ripping up carpet, painting walls, demolishing a kitchen and building a fence. The Bears have also provided financial support throughout the years.

Rivalries

Green Bay Packers

The Green Bay Packers are the Bears' biggest rivals since their team's inception in 1920. The Green Bay Packers currently have the lead at 103–95–6, and the teams have met twice in the postseason. The Bears won the 1941 meeting, 33–14, and eventually defeated the New York Giants in the 1941 NFL Championship Game, and the Packers won the 2011 meeting, 21–14, en route to a Super Bowl XLV win over the Pittsburgh Steelers. The teams' first meeting was a victory for the Bears (known as the Staleys at the time) in 1921 in a shutout, 20–0. The Packers claimed their first win over the Bears in 1925, 14–10. The 1924 matchup (which ended in a 3–0 win for Chicago) was notable for featuring the first-ever ejection of players in a game in NFL history, as Frank Hanny of the Bears and Walter Voss of the Packers were ejected for punching each other. The rivalry also featured one of the last successful fair catch kicks in 1968, when Bears kicker Mac Percival kicked the game-winning field goal.

Minnesota Vikings

Chicago and Minnesota took each other on in the Vikings' inaugural game, with the Vikings defeating the Bears in a 37–13 rout, and Minnesota currently holds the series lead 60–54–2.

Detroit Lions

The Detroit Lions and Bears have faced off since the Lions' inception in 1930, when they were known as the Portsmouth Spartans, with the Spartans winning, 7–6, and Chicago winning the second meeting, 14–6. Since then, the Bears have led the series, 99–74–5. The rivalry grew in 1932, when the Bears and Spartans met in the first-ever postseason game in NFL history, with the Bears winning the game 9–0. The game also was known as the first "indoor football" game, as the game took place in indoor Chicago Stadium due to a blizzard at the time. The game also started the forward pass.

Arizona Cardinals

The Bears originally had an intense intra-city rivalry with the Chicago Cardinals, lasting until 1959 when the Cardinals moved to St. Louis. The rivalry's importance waned further after the Cardinals relocated to the Phoenix metropolitan area in 1988 and eventually became the Arizona Cardinals. While it is the oldest continuing matchup in the NFL, the Bears and Cardinals have yet to meet in the playoffs. The Bears lead the all-time series 59–28–6, and during the Cardinals' tenure in Chicago, the Bears went 47–19–6 against them.

New York Giants

The Bears and the New York Giants squared off in six NFL championship games, more than any common matchup in either the NFL championship game or Super Bowl. The Bears won four of the six championship games, which included the Sneakers Game that the Giants won in the 1934 NFL Championship Game. The two teams also met in the 1985 and 1990 playoffs, splitting each meeting en route to a Super Bowl championship (Bears in Super Bowl XX, Giants in Super Bowl XXV). The Bears lead the all-time series 36–24–2.

Stadium

Soldier Field, located on Lake Shore Drive in Chicago, is the current home of the Bears. The Bears moved to Soldier Field in 1971 after outgrowing Wrigley Field, the team's home for 50 years. Northwestern University's residential neighbors objected to their playing at Dyche Stadium, now called Ryan Field. After the AFL-NFL Merger, the newly merged league wanted their teams to play in stadiums that could hold at least 50,000 fans. Even with the portable bleachers that the team brought into Wrigley, the stadium could still only hold 46,000. Soldier Field's playing turf was changed from natural grass to astroturf before the 1971 season, and then back to natural grass in time for the start of the 1988 season. The stadium was the site of the infamous Fog Bowl playoff game between the Bears and Philadelphia Eagles.

In 2002, the stadium was closed and rebuilt with only the exterior wall of the stadium being preserved. It was closed on Sunday, January 20, 2002, a day after the Bears lost in the playoffs. It reopened on September 27, 2003, after a complete rebuild (the second in the stadium's history). Many fans refer to the rebuilt stadium as "New Soldier Field". During the  season, the Bears played their home games at the University of Illinois' Memorial Stadium in Champaign, where they went 3–5.

Many critics have negative views of the new stadium. They believe that its current structure has made it more of an eyesore than a landmark; some have dubbed it the "Mistake on the Lake". Soldier Field was stripped of its National Historic Landmark designation on February 17, 2006.

In the 2005 season, the Bears won the NFC North Division and the No. 2 Seed in the NFC Playoffs, entitling them to play at least one home game in the postseason. The team hosted (and lost) their divisional round match on January 15, 2006, against the Carolina Panthers. This was the first playoff game at Soldier Field since the stadium reopened.

The stadium's end zones and midfield were not painted until the 1982 season. The design sported on the field included the bolded word "Chicago" rendered in Highway Gothic in both end zones. In 1983, the end zone design returned, with the addition of a large wishbone "C" Bears logo painted at midfield. These field markings remained unchanged until the 1996 season. In 1996 the midfield wishbone "C" was changed to a large blue Bears head, and the end zone design were painted with "Bears" in cursive. This new design remained until the 1999 season, at which point the artwork was returned to the classic "Chicago" and the "C". In the new Soldier Field, the artwork was tweaked to where one end zone had the word "Chicago" bolded and the other had "Bears".

In June 2021, the Bears submitted a bid to purchase the Arlington International Racecourse in Arlington Heights, Illinois from Churchill Downs. Despite negotiations between the city of Chicago to upgrade Soldier Field, the Bears entered into an agreement with Churchill Downs to purchase the Arlington International Racecourse in September 2021 for $197.2 million. The sale of the property which includes 326 acres of potential space for development was officially closed on February 15, 2023.

In popular culture

While the Super Bowl XX champion Bears were a fixture of mainstream American pop culture in the 1980s, the Bears made a prior mark with the 1971 American TV movie Brian's Song starring Billy Dee Williams as Gale Sayers and James Caan as Brian Piccolo. The film told of how Piccolo helped Sayers recover from a devastating knee injury to return to his status as one of the league's best players, and how Sayers in turn helped the Piccolo family through Brian's fatal illness. A 2001 remake of the movie for ABC starred Sean Maher as Piccolo and Mekhi Phifer as Sayers.

The 1985 team is also remembered for recording the song "The Super Bowl Shuffle", which reached number forty-one on the Billboard Hot 100 and was nominated for a Grammy Award. The music video for the song depicts the team rapping that they are "not here to start no trouble" but instead "just here to do the Super Bowl Shuffle". The team took a risk by recording and releasing the song before the playoffs had even begun, but were able to avoid embarrassment by going on to win Super Bowl XX by a then-record margin of 46–10. That game was one of the most-watched television events in history according to the Nielsen ratings system; the game had a rating of 48.3, ranking it seventh in all-time television history.

In addition to the "Super Bowl Shuffle" rap song, the Bears' success in the 1980s – and especially the personality of head coach Mike Ditka – inspired a recurring sketch on the American sketch comedy program Saturday Night Live, called "Bill Swerski's Superfans". The sketch featured Cheers co-star George Wendt, a Chicago native, as host of a radio talk-show (similar in tone to WGN radio's "The Sportswriters"), with co-panelists Carl Wollarski (Robert Smigel), Pat Arnold (Mike Myers) and Todd O'Connor (Chris Farley). To hear them tell it, "Da Bears" and Coach Ditka could do no wrong. The sketch stopped after Ditka was fired in 1993. The sketch usually showed the panelists chugging beer and eating lots of Polish sausage, and often featured Todd getting so agitated about what was happening with the Bears that he suffered a heart attack, but quickly recovered (through self-administered CPR). The sketch also features the cast predicting unrealistic blowout victories for Bears games. Da Super Fan sketch has not been brought back by SNL, with the exception of a single appearance by Horatio Sanz as a Super Fan for the Cubs on "Weekend Update" in 2003. Outside of SNL, George Wendt reprised his role of Swerski in the opening promo of Super Bowl XL on ABC.

On TV shows based in Chicago such as The Bob Newhart Show, Married... with Children, Family Matters, Still Standing, According to Jim, Early Edition and The Bernie Mac Show, the main characters are all Bears fans, and have worn Bears' jerseys and T-shirts on some occasions. Some episodes even show them watching Bears games. Roseanne is another TV show based in Illinois (albeit not in Chicago itself) to feature the Bears as the consensus household favorite, as 'Dan Connor' John Goodman is seen wearing Bears hats in several episodes. That '70s Show featured several Bears references, as it was based in Wisconsin, home of the Packers. On one episode while the gang is at a Bears vs. Packers game, Eric comes to the seat in a Walter Payton jersey and is booed by the surrounding Packers fans. In an episode of the Disney Channel show Shake It Up, based in Chicago, recurring character Dina Garcia (Ainsley Bailey) sold scalped Chicago Bears tickets. More recently, Modern Family character Cameron Tucker has been shown as a Bears fan. In an episode of the Disney Channel show "I Didn't Do It", based in Chicago, Lindy Watson (Olivia Holt) and Logan Watson (Austin North) try to get a football signed by NFL Hall of Famer Dick Butkus after destroying their fathers Butkus signed ball, Alshon Jeffery also makes a cameo appearance as well.

Ditka's success and popularity in Chicago has led him to land analyst roles on various American football pregame shows. Ditka worked for both the NFL on NBC and CBS's The NFL Today, and he currently works on ESPN's Sunday NFL Countdown and provided Friday night analysis on the Bears on WBBM-TV's 2 on Football with former WBBM-TV sports director Mark Malone. He is also the color analyst for all local broadcasts of Bears preseason games. Ditka also co-starred himself alongside actor Will Ferrell in the 2005 comedy film Kicking & Screaming.

Also, Ditka, Dick Butkus, Walter Payton, Jim McMahon, William "Refrigerator" Perry and Brian Urlacher are among Bears figures known for their appearances in TV commercials. Urlacher, whose jersey was among the league's best-selling in 2002, was featured on Nike commercials with former Atlanta Falcons quarterback Michael Vick.

In the 1961 Hanna-Barbera animated short "Rah Rah Bear", Yogi Bear helps the Bears beat the New York Giants.
The Bears were later depicted in an episode of the 1985 cartoon version of the NBC sitcom Punky Brewster, where the Bears are playing the Green Bay Packers.

Clark Griswold (Chevy Chase) from the National Lampoon's Vacation series appears in some scenes wearing a navy blue with burnt orange scripting Chicago Bears ball cap. He wears the same Chicago Bears cap throughout all four Vacation movies.

Broadcast media

Radio

Currently, WMVP (1000 AM) broadcast Bears games with Jeff Joniak doing the play-by-play, along with color commentator Tom Thayer, who played for the Bears from 1985 to 1992. Over the years, many Bears play-by-play broadcasters have included play-by-play announcers Jack Brickhouse, Joe McConnell and Wayne Larrivee, and color commentators Hub Arkush, Dick Butkus, Jim Hart and Irv Kupcinet.

Spanish radio station WLEY-FM aired the Bears games from 2012 to 2014. Since 2015, WRTO and WVIV-FM air Bears games in Spanish.

Television
Preseason games air on WFLD (channel 32). The announcers are Adam Amin (play-by-play), Jim Miller (color commentary) and Lou Canellis (sideline reporter). WFLD also carries the majority of the team's regular season games through the NFL on Fox. Any Bears home games against AFC teams are aired on the CBS O&O station, WBBM-TV, which was the Bears' unofficial "home" station from 1956 until Fox won the NFC rights in 1995. Sunday Night games are broadcast on WMAQ-TV, the NBC O&O station, with ESPN Monday Night Football games rotating between WLS-TV and WCIU-TV (dependent on opponent, along with ABC's Monday night entertainment schedule).

Statistics and records
Patrick Mannelly holds the record for the most seasons in a Bears uniform with 16. On the other hand, Steve McMichael holds the record for most consecutive games played by a Bear with 191; he accomplished the feat from 1981 to 1993. In second place is Payton, who played 186 games from 1975 to 1987 at running back, a position considered to be conducive to injury, only missing one game in a span of 13 seasons.

Kicker Robbie Gould became the Bears' all-time scoring leader in Week 5 of 2015 season overtaking placekicker Kevin Butler who previously held the club record for scoring the most points in his ten-year Bear career. He scored 1,116 points as the Bears kicker from 1985 to 1995. He is followed by running back Walter Payton, with 750 points. Payton holds the team record for career rushing yards with 16,726. Former Bears running back Matt Forte, who started playing for the Bears in 2008, is the closest to Payton's record with 6,985 yards. Forte also holds the team's single season record for rookies in rushing attempts, rushing yards and receptions. Mark Bortz holds the record for most Bear playoff appearances, with 13 between 1983 and 1994, and is followed by Kevin Butler, Dennis Gentry, Dan Hampton, Jay Hilgenberg, Steve McMichael, Ron Rivera, Mike Singletary, and Keith Van Horne, who have each played in 12 playoff games.

The 1940 Chicago Bears team holds the record for the biggest margin of victory in an NFL game (playoff or regular season) with a 73–0 victory over the Washington Redskins in the 1940 NFL Championship Game. The largest home victory for the Bears came in a 61–7 result against the Green Bay Packers in 1980. The largest defeat in club history was a 52–0 loss against the Baltimore Colts in 1964. The club recorded undefeated regular seasons in 1934 and 1942, but (unlike the 1972 Dolphins) did not win the championship game in either season. In 1934, the club completed a 13–0 record but were defeated by the New York Giants, and in 1942 the club completed an 11–0 record but were defeated by the Redskins. Had the Bears won either championship, the club would have completed a championship three-peat – a feat completed only by the Packers (twice), although no team has done it since the AFL-NFL merger. Halas holds the team record for coaching the most seasons with 40 and for having the most career victories of 324. Ditka is the closest Bears coach to Halas, with 112 career victories. No other Bears coach has recorded over 100 victories with the team.

During the 2006 season, return specialist Devin Hester set several kick return records. He currently holds the franchise record for most return yards with 2,261. He had six touchdown returns, setting a record for most returns in a single season. In 2007, he recorded another six touchdown season from returns. One of the most notable of these returns came on November 12, 2006, when he returned a missed field goal for a 108-yard touchdown. The record tied former teammate Nathan Vasher's previous record, which was set almost a year earlier. Additionally, Hester set a Super Bowl record by becoming the first player to return an opening kick of a Super Bowl for a touchdown. On December 20, 2010, Hester set an NFL record for most touchdowns on a punt or kickoff return with his 14th career return coming against the Minnesota Vikings. In 2011, Hester broke the record for the most punt returns against the Carolina Panthers.

In 2012, Charles Tillman set the record for most forced fumbles in a single game with 4 against the Tennessee Titans. Also against the Titans, Chicago became the first team in league history to score a touchdown pass, a touchdown run, an interception return for a touchdown, and a blocked kick/punt for a score in the same quarter. Tillman and teammate Lance Briggs became the first pair in NFL history to return an interception for a touchdown in consecutive games against the Jacksonville Jaguars and Dallas Cowboys.

Season-by-season results
This is a partial list of the Bears' last five completed seasons. For the full season-by-season franchise results, see List of Chicago Bears seasons.

Note: The Finish, Wins, Losses, and Ties columns list regular season results and exclude any postseason play.

As of January 17, 2021

Records

Players of note

Current roster

Pro Football Hall of Famers

In the Pro Football Hall of Fame, the Bears have the most enshrined primary members with 30; the club also has had seven Hall of Famers spend a minor portion of their career with the franchise. Founder, owner, head coach, and player George Halas, halfback Bronko Nagurski, and Red Grange were a part of the original class of inductees in 1963. The franchise saw 14 individuals inducted into the Hall of Fame from 1963 to 1967. Offensive tackle Jim Covert and defensive end Ed Sprinkle are the most recent Chicago Bear inductees, both being inducted as seniors as part of the Pro Football Hall of Fame's centennial class of 2020. In 2023 Chuck Howley, who only played minor portion of his career with the Bears, got elected as a Seniors candidate.

Chicagoland Sports Hall of Fame

Retired numbers
The Bears have retired 14 uniform numbers, which is the most in the NFL, and ranks fourth behind the basketball Boston Celtics (23), baseball New York Yankees (21), and hockey Montreal Canadiens (15) for the most in major professional sports leagues in the United States and Canada. The Bears retired Mike Ditka's number 89 jersey on December 9, 2013. It is the last number that the Bears retired.

Top 100 greatest Bears of all-time
In honor of the team centennial anniversary, on May 20, 2019, the Chicago Bears have unveiled the Top 100 players in franchise history, as voted on by Hall of Fame writers Don Pierson and Dan Pompei, two of the most famous journalists that have ever covered the club in their long history. At the time of the publish, the list included 27 Pro Football Hall of Famers, while two more inductees would join in the 2020 class (Jim Covert and Ed Sprinkle).

Among the 100 Greatest, four active players made the list, including safety Eddie Jackson (96), defensive lineman Akiem Hicks (75), offensive lineman Kyle Long (74) and highest-ranked active Bear was Khalil Mack (60), who played only one season with the team at the time of the unveilment of the list. Long would retire the following year.

On later date, Chicagobears.com released a list titled "Top 10: Best of the rest", that featured the top 10 snubs from the centennial list. The players include (in a following order): Alex Brown, Thomas Jones, Dave Whitsell, Curtis Conway, Tim Jennings, Leslie Frazier, Roberto Garza, Marty Booker, Nathan Vasher and William Perry.

 Pro Football Hall of Fame inductee.
 Pro Football Hall of Fame finalist.

All-Time Team
During the week of June 3, 2019 the All-Time Team was announced in parts each day starting with the All-Time defensive players, followed by the All-Time specialists and then the All-Time offensive players. Bold indicates those elected to the Pro Football Hall of Fame.

Larry Mayer of the Chicagobears.com would later state, that according to the voters "if they had included a long-snapper on the team it would have been Patrick Mannelly".

Offense

Defense

Special teams

* As a Chicago Bear

Coaching staff

References

Sources

External links

 
 Chicago Bears at the National Football League official website
 Chicago Bears at ESPN.com
 Chicago Bears at the Chicago Tribune

 
National Football League teams
Bears
American football teams established in 1920
1920 establishments in Illinois